WKQW (1120 AM) is a radio station broadcasting a sports format. It previously had an oldies format until July 13, 2012, and before that, a classic country format until August 15, 2008. Licensed to Oil City, Pennsylvania, United States, the station is currently owned by Robert Lowe, through licensee Twilight Broadcasting, Inc. WKQW remains Venango County's only locally operated, programmed, and managed full-service radio station.

History
WKQW was founded in 1982 by local broadcaster and engineer Stephen M. Olszowka, but would not go on the air until December 1987. For most of its early years, WKQW operated out of an office at 234 Elm Street in Oil City.  The station moved to 222 Seneca Street in 1993 when WKQW-FM went on the air.

Olszowka died suddenly on February 14, 2004, at age 54 and ownership of the station passed to his mother Helen Gesing Olszowka.  She sold the station less than a year later to William Hearst's Clarion County Broadcasting for $540,000.

Hearst is also the owner of WWCH and WCCR-FM, both of which are licensed to Clarion County Broadcasting.

In November 2018, the radio station, along with WKQW-FM, was sold to Robert Lowe, owner of Twilight Broadcasting, Inc. The sale, at a price of $265,000, was consummated on February 12, 2019.

In July 2019, WKQW added an FM translator with assigned calls of W281CA at the frequency of 104.1 FM, broadcasting at a power of 250 watts.

WKQW maintains its studio and office presence and staff at 806C Grandview Road in Oil City.

References

External links
Fox Sports & Mix 96 Facebook

KQW
Radio stations established in 1987
1987 establishments in Pennsylvania
KQW